The 2007 FINA Men's Water Polo World League was the sixth edition of the annual event, organised by the world's governing body in aquatics, the FINA. After six preliminary rounds the Super Final was held in Berlin, Germany from August 7 to August 12, 2007.

Preliminary round

Asia/Oceania
Held in Shanghai, PR China 

July 3, 2007

July 4, 2007

July 5, 2007

July 6, 2007

July 7, 2007

July 8, 2007

Europe I
Held in Novi Sad, Serbia and Pescara, Italy 

Germany qualified as the hosting nation of the Super Final
July 4, 2007

July 5, 2007

July 6, 2007

July 7, 2007

July 8, 2007

July 18, 2007

July 19, 2007

July 20, 2007

July 21, 2007

July 22, 2007

Europe II
Held in Budapest, Hungary and Portugalete, Spain 

July 4, 2007

July 5, 2007

July 6, 2007

July 7, 2007

July 8, 2007

July 18, 2007

July 19, 2007

July 20, 2007

July 21, 2007

July 22, 2007

Super Final

Teams

GROUP A

 
 
 

GROUP B

Squads

Mitchal Ainsworth
Jamie Beadsworth
Ritchie Campbell
John Cotterill
Pietro Figlioli
Trent Franklin
Robert Maitland
Anthony Martin
Ryan Moody
Nick O'Halloran
Grant Richardson
James Stanton
Thomas Whalan
Head coach:
John Fox

Brandon Jung
Aaron Feltham
Kevin Graham
Con Kudaba
Thomas Marks
Nathaniel Miller
Noah Miller
Kevin Mitchell
Jean Sayegh
Robin Randall
Andrew Robinson
Daniel Stein
Nic Youngblud
Head coach:
Dragan Jovanović

Ge Weiqing
Guo Junliang
Huang Quanhua
Bin Li
Li Jun
Liang Zhongxing
Qiu Yuanzhong
Tan Feihu
Han Zhidong
Yu Lijun
Yang Wang
Wang Yong
Wu Zhiyu
Head coach:
Miroslav Trumbic

Steffen Dierolf
Roger Kong
Tobias Kreuzmann
Sören Mackeben
Florian Naroska
Heiko Nossek
Moritz Oeler
Marc Politze
Marko Savić
Thomas Scherwitis
Andreas Schlotterbeck
Fabian Schrödter
Alexander Tchigir
Head coach:
Hagen Stamm

László Baksa
Péter Biros
Rajmund Fodor
Miklós Gór-Nagy
Norbert Hosnyánszky
Gergely Kiss
Csaba Kiss
Gabor Kiss
Norbert Madaras
Tamás Molnár
Zoltán Szécsi
Márton Szivós
Dániel Varga
Head coach:
Dénes Kemény

Edward Andrei
Cosmin Baldoc
Andrei Busila
Robert Dinu
Gheorghe Dunca
Andrei Iosep
Ramiro Georgescu
George Georgescu
Alexandru Ghiban
Kalman Kadar
Tiberiu Negrean
Bertini Nenciu
Cosmin Radu
Head coach:
Vlad Hagiu

Milan Aleksić
Aleksandar Ćirić
Filip Filipović
Živko Gocić
Stefan Mitrović
Slobodan Nikić
Duško Pijetlović
Gojko Pijetlović
Andrija Prlainović
Aleksandar Šapić
Dejan Savić
Slobodan Soro
Vanja Udovičić
Head coach:
Dejan Udovičić

Tony Azevedo
Ryan Bailey
Ronald Beaubien
Adam Hewko
Thomas Hopkins
Peter Hudnut
Genai Kerr
John Mann
Merrill Moses
Jeffrey Powers
Jesse Smith
Peter Varellas
Adam Wright
Head coach:
Terry Schroeder

Group A

August 7, 2007

August 8, 2007

August 9, 2007

Group B

August 7, 2007

August 8, 2007

August 9, 2007

Quarterfinals
August 10, 2007

Semifinals
August 11, 2007

Finals
August 12, 2007 — Seventh place

August 12, 2007 — Fifth place

August 12, 2007 — Third place

August 12, 2007 — First place

Final ranking

Serbia qualified for the 2008 Summer Olympics in Beijing, PR China

Awards

References

 FINA
Sports123

FINA Water Polo World League
W
W
International water polo competitions hosted by Germany